William Osborne Goode (September 16, 1798 – July 3, 1859) was a nineteenth-century American politician, slave owner and lawyer from Virginia.

Early life and education
Goode was born to plantation owner and horse racing enthusiast John Chesterfield Goode (d. 1837) and his wife Lucy Claiborne Goode at their plantation  "Inglewood" near the Roanoke River in Mecklenburg County, Virginia. He would later establish a plantation of his own, "Wheatland", about five miles northeast of Boydton. He had another relative John Goode, locally known as Race Horse John, who predeceased John C. Goode, who had inherited 13 slaves which were in his estate inventory, as were many horses, some owned by various partnership.

William Goode graduated from the College of William and Mary in 1819. He married twice. In 1820, while in law school, he married Sarah Bolling Tazewell of Williamsburg, Virginia. She died July 9, 1825, aged 22, after her second childbirth, although that son, Tazewell Goode, would die as an infant, as had his brother William O. Goode Jr. In 1829 William Goode married Sarah Maria Massie (d. 1844), who bore several children who lived to adulthood, but also died shortly after childbirth and her daughter Sarah Massie Goode died as a child. Two of her sons married, Lucy Herbert Waller Goode Baskerville (1833-1863) and Henrietta Waller Goode Boyd (1842-1876). Three of their sons became Confederate States Army officers after their father's death and Virginia's secession, of whom William Osborne Goode Jr. (1830-1865) died in battle. John Thomas Goode (1835-1916), who had attended the Virginia Military Institute but resigned before graduation to accept a lieutenant's commission in the U.S. Army, would relinquish it and rise to the rank of Major in the Confederate States Army. They son Edward Branch Goode (1839-1920) would also become a Confederate officer (in the 34th Virginia Infantry) and survive the war. J. Thomas Goode would marry four times, and his son, Morton G. Goode would follow the family's traditional careers in law and politics to become president pro tem of the Virginia senate.

Early career

Admitted to the Virginia bar in 1821, William Goode set up a legal practice in Boydton, Virginia.

Political career
Goode represented Mecklenburg County in the Virginia House of Delegates from 1822 to 1823.  He was re-elected in 1824 and afterward, expecting to serve through the term ending 1833. He gave up his seat to make an unsuccessful 1832 run for the United States House of Representatives. During that time, he also was a member of the Virginia Constitutional Convention of 1829.

Goode was re-elected to the House of Delegates (1839–41). He was elected as a Democrat to the United States House of Representatives in 1840, serving from 1841 to 1843. He was elected again to the Virginia House from 1845 to 1847, and was elected as Speaker. He served as delegate to the second Virginia Constitutional Convention in 1850.

Elected again to the US House of Representatives in 1852, he served three terms, from 1853 until his death in 1859. He became chairman of the Committee on the District of Columbia from 1857 to 1858.

Death and legacy
Goode died in Boydton on July 3, 1859.  He was buried at his nearby plantation of "Wheatland", which did not survive into the 20th century, although his birthplace "Inglewood" did.

Electoral history
1841; Goode was elected to the U.S. House of Representatives with 75% of the vote, defeating Independents Richard H. Baptist and a man identified only as Marshall.
1853; Goode was re-elected to the U.S. House of Representatives with 65.34% of the vote, defeating Whig Wyatt Cardwell and Independents William C. Flournoy and William S. Scott.
1855; Goode was re-elected with 61.27% of the vote, defeating American Littleton Tazewell.
1857; Goode was re-elected with 75.97% of the vote, defeating an American identified only as Collier.
1859; Goode was re-elected with 63.79% of the vote, defeating Independent Democrat Flournoy.

Legacy and honors
A cenotaph was erected in his memory at Congressional Cemetery in Washington, D.C.

See also
List of United States Congress members who died in office (1790–1899)

Notes

References

Virginia Elections and State Elected Officials Database Biography

1798 births
1859 deaths
Speakers of the Virginia House of Delegates
Virginia lawyers
College of William & Mary alumni
People from Mecklenburg County, Virginia
Democratic Party members of the United States House of Representatives from Virginia
Virginia Whigs
19th-century American politicians
19th-century American lawyers
Burials in Virginia
People from Boydton, Virginia
American slave owners